Theresa Amerley Tagoe (December 13, 1943 – November 25, 2010) also known as Iron Lady was a Ghanaian female politician and a leading member of the New Patriotic Party and a former Member of Parliament of the Ablekuma South Constituency.

Early life
Tagoe, of the Ga people, was born on 13 December 1943.

Education
Tagoe had her secondary education at Aburi Girls Senior High School where she was the school prefect. She obtained a bachelor's degree in French from the University of Ghana.

Philanthropy 
Tagoe owned a girls' secretarial school that included French in its curriculum, as well as starting charitable programs including one to help orphaned and street girls learn productive trades and a micro-credit loan program for women marketing dried fish on the streets of Accra.

Political career
Theresa Tagoe was also the deputy Greater Accra Regional Minister and deputy Minister of Lands, Forestry and Mines under the erstwhile John Kufuor's  administration.

Tagoe was also one time national women's organizer of the New Patriotic Party.

She was elected into parliament on 7 January 1997 after emerging winner at the 1996 Ghanaian General Elections. She obtained 39.90% of the total votes cast which is equivalent to 47,644 votes by defeating Ebo Hawkson of the National Democratic Congress who obtained 35.70% which is equivalent to 42,568 votes

Legacy
Tagoe served as a member of Council of State and was a lifelong member of the Council of Women World Leaders. The Dansoman Roundabout was named after her known as the 'Theresa Ameley Tagoe Roundabout' and a statue was raised to honor her.

Personal life 
Theresa Tagoe had two sons.

References

1943 births
2010 deaths
People from Accra
New Patriotic Party politicians
Government ministers of Ghana
Women government ministers of Ghana
Women members of the Parliament of Ghana
Alumni of Aburi Girls' Senior High School
Ghanaian educators
Ghanaian MPs 1997–2001
People from Greater Accra Region
21st-century Ghanaian women politicians
20th-century Ghanaian women politicians